
Year 266 (CCLXVI) was a common year starting on Monday (link will display the full calendar) of the Julian calendar. At the time, it was known as the Year of the Consulship of Gallienus and Sabinillus (or, less frequently, year 1019 Ab urbe condita). The denomination 266 for this year has been used since the early medieval period, when the Anno Domini calendar era became the prevalent method in Europe for naming years.

Events 
 By place 
 Roman Empire 
 King Odaenathus of Palmyra invades Persia to conquer the capital, Ctesiphon, and twice comes as far as the walls of the Persian capital, but fails to take it.Babylonia Judaica in the Talmudic Period By A'haron Oppenheimer, Benjamin H. Isaac, Michael Lecker After his victories in the East, he pronounces himself with the title "king of kings".
 A powerful tropical volcanic eruption around this year brings a below-average flood of the Nile next year.

 Ireland 
 The rule of High King Cormac mac Airt ends (approximate date).

 Asia 
 February 4 – Sima Yan, regent of the Chinese state of Cao Wei, forces the last Cao Wei emperor Cao Huan to abdicate in his favour. The Cao Wei state's existence comes to an end. Sima Yan establishes the Jin Dynasty, and becomes its first emperor on 8 February, and is historically known as "Wu of Jin". He establishes his capital at Luoyang, and gives his male relatives independent military commands throughout his empire.

Births 
 Galeria Valeria, Roman empress and wife of Galerius (d. 315)
 Wang Dun (or Chuzhong), Chinese general and warlord (d. 324)
 Zu Ti (or Shizhi), Chinese general and adviser (d. 321)

Deaths 
 Wang Chen (or Chudao), Chinese general and politician
 Wang Fan, Chinese astronomer and mathematician (b. 228)

References